Połomia  is a village in the administrative district of Gmina Pilzno, within Dębica County, Subcarpathian Voivodeship, in south-eastern Poland.

The village has a population of 78.

References

Villages in Dębica County